Manoj Punj  was an Indian Punjabi film director. He directed the hits in Punjabi Cinema. After graduating with a degree in arts, and experiencing theater in Chandigarh, he assisted Prof. P. S. Nirola who made corporate and documentary films. He then shifted to Mumbai where he began his career as an assistant in various television and film projects. Few years later he started directing various kinds of TV programmes independently. This was followed by a series of hit Punjabi films. Manoj Punj died on 22 October 2006 due to a cardiac arrest in Mumbai, Maharashtra state of India at a young age of 36.

Filmography

 Waris Shah: Ishq Daa Waaris (2006)
 Des Hoya Pardes (2004)
 Zindagi Khoobsoorat Hai (2002)
 Shaheed-E-Mohabbat (1999)

Writer
 Sukhmani – Hope for Life (2010)

See also

 Gurdas Maan
 Shaheed-E-Mohabbat

References

Punjabi artists
Punjabi people
1970 births
2006 deaths
Punjabi-language film directors
Film directors from Mumbai